Football Federation of Donetsk Oblast (FFD) is a football governing body in the region of Donetsk Oblast, Ukraine. The federation is a  collective member of the Football Federation of Ukraine.

The Donetsk Oblast was formed on 2 July 1932 by combining territories of okruhas of the Ukrainian SSR of Starobilsk, Luhansk, Artemivsk, Stalino and Mariupol, and until 3 June 1938 covering territory of today's Donetsk and Luhansk oblasts.

Championship

1932    Horlivka city
1933    Metalist Kostyantynivka
1934    Dynamo Horlivka
1935    Dynamo Horlivka (2)
1936    Koval Factory Stalino
1937    Stal Kostyantynivka (2)
1938    Stakhanovets Stalino (res)
1939    ???
1940    Stakhanovets Ordzhonikidze
1941-43 not held (World War II)
1944    Stakhanovets Stalino (2)
1945    Stakhnovets Rutchenkove
1946    Stal Makiivka
1947    Avanhard Kramatorsk
1948    Stal Kostyantynivka (3)
1949    Metalurh Zhdanov
1950    Vodnyk Zhdanov
1951    Shakhtar Druzhkivka
1952    Shakhtar Stalino (Kuibyshevskyi District) (3)
1953    Metalurh Zhdanov (2)
1954    Shakhtar Yenakieve
1955    Shakhtar Budyonivka
1956    Metalurh Chasiv Yar
1957    Shakhtar Stalino (Kuibyshevskyi District) (4)
1958    Metalurh Chasiv Yar (2)
1959    Shakhtar Stalino (Kuibyshevskyi District) (5)
1960    Shakhtar Stalino (Kuibyshevskyi District) (6)
1961    Metalurh Yenakieve
1962    Metalurh Yenakieve (2)
1963    Shakhtar Chystyakove
1964    Shakhtar Torez
1965    Start Dzerzhynsk
1966    Avtoshklo Kostyantynivka
1967    Shakhtar Krasnoarmiysk
1968    Shakhtar Makiivka
1969    Kolormash Artemivsk
1970    Shakhtar Snizhne
1971    Khimik Horlivka
1972    Khimik Horlivka (2)
1973    Shakhtar Torez (2)
1974    Hirnyk Makiivka
1975    Kirovets Makiivka
1976    Monolit Donetsk
1977    Mashynobudivnyk Druzhkivka
1978    Kirovets Makiivka
1979    Shakhtar Dzerzhynsk
1980    Tekstylnyk Donetsk
1981    Azovstal Zhdanov
1982    Bazhanovets Makiivka (2)
1983    Kirovets Makiivka
1984    Metalurh Yenakieve (3)
1985    Bazhanovets Makiivka (3)
1986    Bazhanovets Makiivka (4)
1987    Kirovets Makiivka (2)
1988    Shakhtobudivnyk Donetsk
1989    Kirovets Makiivka (3)
1990    Kolormash Artemivsk (3)
1991    Harant Donetsk
1992    Harant Donetsk (2)
1992/93 Kirovets Makiivka (4)
1993/94 Shakhtar Selidove
1994/95 Kolos Ilovaisk
1995/96 Avanhard Kramatorsk (2)
1996(f) Pivdenstal Yenakiieve (4)
1997    Shakhtar Horlivka
1998    Koksokhim Avdiivka
1999    Fortuna Shakhtarsk
2000    Vuhlyk Dymytrov
2001    Slavkhlib Slovyansk
2002    Slavkhlib Slovyansk (2)
2003    Slavkhlib Slovyansk (3)
2004    Slavkhlib Slovyansk (4)
2005    Slavkhlib Slovyansk (5)
2006    Portovyk Mariupol
2007    Slavkhlib Slovyansk (6)
2008    Slavkhlib Slovyansk (7)
2009    Slavkhlib Slovyansk (8)
2010    Avanhard Kramatorsk (3)
2011    Slavkhlib Slovyansk (9)
2012    Voda Donbasa Donetsk
2013    Ayaks Shakhtarsk (2)
2014    not held (Russian invasion of Ukraine)
2015    Slavkhlib Slovyansk (as Donbas championship) (10)
2016    Slavkhlib Slovyansk (as Open championship of Donetsk Oblast) (11)
2017    Sapfir Kramatorsk
2018    Sapfir Kramatorsk (2)
2019    Prometei Velyka Novosilka (3)
2020    Shakhtar Rodynske

Top winners
 11 - FC Slavkhlib Slovyansk
 4 - 4 clubs (Dynamo (Shakhtar), Shakhtar Stalino (Kuibyshevskyi District), Kirovets M., Pivdenstal (Metalurh))
 3 - 3 clubs (Bazhanovets, Avanhard Kr., Sapfir)
 2 - 7 clubs
 1 - 31 clubs

Cup winners

1996(f) FC Vuhlyk Dymytrov
1997    ???
1998    ???
1999    ???
2000    ???
2001    FC Pivdenstal Yenakiieve
2002    FC Slavkhlib Slovyansk
2003    FC Slavkhlib Slovyansk
2004    ???
2005    ???
2006    ???
2007    FC Slavkhlib Slovyansk
2008    FC Konti Kostyantynivka
2009    FC Slavkhlib Slovyansk
2010    ???
2011    ???
2012    FC Slavkhlib Slovyansk
2013    FC Nova-Lyuks Donetsk
2014    Russian invasion of Ukraine
2015    FC Slavkhlib Slovyansk
2016    
2017

Donbas Championship
Along with the Football Federation of Luhansk Oblast, the Federation conducts united Donbas Championship since 2012. Since 2015 it service as the championship of Donetsk Oblast.
2012    USK Rubin Donetsk
2013    USK Rubin Donetsk
2014    Russian invasion of Ukraine
2015    FC Slavkhlib Slovyansk
2016    FC Slavkhlib Slovyansk

DNR Championship
Due to the Russian aggression, the Russian occupying forces conduct own competition.
2016    FC Pobeda Donetsk
2017    FC Pobeda Donetsk
2018    FC Gvardeets Donetsk
2019    FC Gvardeets Donetsk
2020    FC Gvardeets Donetsk

Donbass League (DNR)
2019    FC Shakhter Sverdlovsk
2020

Professional clubs
 FC Shakhtar Donetsk (Ugolschiki Horlivka, Stakhanovets), 1936-1941, 1945-
 FC Shakhtar-2 Donetsk (Metalurh Kostiantynivka), 1992-2006
 FC Shakhtar-3 Donetsk, 2000-2015
 FC Stal Kostiantynivka, 1936f-1937, 1946
 FC Stal Mariupol, 1946
 FC Avanhard Kramatorsk, 1946, 1948-1949
 FC Avangard Horlivka, 1946
 FC Lokomotiv Yasynuvata, 1946
 FC Stakhanovets Rutchenkove, 1946
 FC Lokomotiv Donetsk, 1958-1973
 FC Shakhtar Horlivka, 1959-1973, 1976-1988, 1992/93, 1994/95, 1998-2000
 FC Kramatorsk (Avanhard), 1960-1970, 2011-2014, 2015-2021
 FC Avanhard-2 Kramatorsk, 2019/20
 FC Mariupol (Avangard, Azovstal), 1960-1964, 1966-1973, 1975-2021
 FC Metalurh-2 Mariupol, 2000-2012, 2016/17
 FC Pivdenstal Yenakieve (Metallurg), 1963, 1997/98
 FC Shakher Torez, 1965-1970
 FC Kirovets Makiivka (Avangard), 1966-1970
 FC Start Dzerzhynsk, 1966-1969
 FC Shakhter Yenakieve (Industriya), 1964-1969
 FC Sitall Kostiantynivka, 1967-1969
 FC Ugolyok Krasnoarmiysk, 1968-1969
 FC Kholodna Balka Makiivka (Shakhter), 1972-1973
 FC Shakhtar Makiivka, 1992-1999
 FC Shakhtar Shakhtarsk, 1992-1995 --> FC Metalurh Donetsk
 FC Metalurh Donetsk, 1996-2015 --> FC Stal Kamianske
 FC Metalurh-2 Donetsk, 2001-2004
 FC Khartsyzk, 1992-1994
 FC Antratsyt Kirovske, 1992-1993
 FC Dynamo Sloviansk, 1995/96
 FC Metalurh Komsomolske, 1997/98
 FC VPS Kramatorsk, 1998/99
 FC Mashynobudivnyk Druzhkivka, 1999-2002
 FC Uholyok Dymytrov, 2002-2005
 FC Olimpik Donetsk, 2004-2021
 FC Tytan Donetsk, 2007-2009
 FC Makiivvuhillia Makiivka, 2011-2015 --> FC Nikopol
 FSC Mariupol (Yarud), 2020-

See also
 FFU Council of Regions

References

External links
 Football Union of DNR

Football in the regions of Ukraine
Football governing bodies in Ukraine
Sport in Donetsk Oblast